The 1977–78 NBA season was the Detroit Pistons' 30th season in the NBA and 21st season in the city of Detroit.  The team played at Cobo Arena in Detroit.

It was the last season playing in Detroit, until the 2017-18 season when the team returned to the city proper. 1977-78 was the franchise's final season in Cobo Arena, as they moved to the Pontiac Silverdome in the Detroit suburbs, also the home of the NFL's Detroit Lions, the next season.  

The Pistons finished with a 38-44 (.463) record, 4th place in the Midwest Division.  Tensions lingered from the previous season, especially between coach Herb Brown and point guard Kevin Porter.  Before the season began, the two tried to make peace, with Porter stating, "This year when I'm yanked I'll accept it," and Brown replying, "I may have made some mistakes." Team captain Bob Lanier, would add, "You can't change human nature. To be fair they should trade one of them."  Porter was traded in November, 8 games into the season, to the New Jersey Nets and would lead the NBA in assists on the season.  Brown was fired a month later.  Then, with Brown gone, Porter would return in a trade to Detroit the following season.  

Forward Marvin "Bad News" Barnes would report to the Adult Correctional Institute in Cranston, Rhode Island in the 1977 off-season to serve a 152-day sentence.  He had pleaded guilty to a two-year-old charge that he had attacked Providence teammate Larry Ketvirtis with a tire iron. The judge gave him three years of probation. An October 1976 gun incident at the Detroit airport in which Barnes tried to get a weapon through security was a probation violation, causing the judge to require the completion of that initial sentence.  Barnes was traded to the Buffalo Braves in November, bringing Gus Gerard and John Shumate to Detroit.  

The team was led by center Bob Lanier (24.5 ppg, 11.3 rpg, NBA All-Star) and guard Eric Money (18.6 ppg, 4.7 apg), out of the playoffs for the first time in 4 seasons.

Draft picks

Roster

Regular season

Season standings

z – clinched division title
y – clinched division title
x – clinched playoff spot

Record vs. opponents

References

Detroit Pistons seasons
Detroit
Detroit Pistons
Detroit Pistons